The women's 1500 metres event  at the 1985 European Athletics Indoor Championships was held on 3 March.

Results

References

1500 metres at the European Athletics Indoor Championships
1500
Euro